Ihor Volodymyrovych Kostyuk (born 14 September 1975) is a Ukrainian professional football manager and a former player. He manages the Under-19 squad of FC Dynamo Kyiv.

Career
In 2009, he played for FC CSKA Kyiv. He made his professional debut in 1992 for FC Dynamo-2 Kyiv.

Honours
 Ukrainian Premier League champion: 1996.

References

1975 births
Living people
Ukrainian footballers
Association football midfielders
Ukraine international footballers
FC Dynamo Kyiv players
FC Tyumen players
FC Vorskla Poltava players
FC Hoverla Uzhhorod players
FC Arsenal Kyiv players
FC Borysfen Boryspil players
FC CSKA Kyiv players
Ukrainian Premier League players
Russian Premier League players
Ukrainian football managers
FC Dynamo-2 Kyiv players
Ukrainian expatriate footballers
Expatriate footballers in Russia
Ukrainian expatriate sportspeople in Russia
FC Dynamo Kyiv non-playing staff